Goraj  is a town in Biłgoraj County, Lublin Voivodeship, in eastern Poland. It is the seat of the gmina (administrative district) called Gmina Goraj. The town has a population of 1,048. It was granted town rights in the 14th century, lost them in 1869 and was granted them again in 2021.

The name of the town probably comes from the Polish language word  ('mountain'), and is related to the location of Goraj, among the hills of the Roztocze. In a 1377, Goray. The document was issued by King Louis I, mentions that two members of local nobility, were granted "". The medieval Goray Castle, which was also called Lada Castle, probably was surrounded by a village, where servants and artisans dwelled. It is not known when the village was granted Magdeburg rights, it probably happened in the early 1370s, as in a 1373 document, a person named Demetrio de Goray is mentioned, which suggests that it already was a town in that year. In 1389, King Wladyslaw Jagiello confirmed Goraj's charter. Until 1508, the town belonged to the Gorajski family, and in the 16th century, it was property of several noble families – the Firlejs, the Sienienskis, the Trojanowskis, and in 1595, it was purchased by one of the most powerful magnates in the Polish–Lithuanian Commonwealth, Jan Zamoyski, who in 1596 incorporated Goraj into his landed property, Ordynacja Zamojska (Zamość Estate).

In 1540, a Calvinist prayer house was built at Goraj. It remained in use until ca. 1625, and in 1561, the town received permission to build butcher shops and a town hall. In the same year, Goraj burned in a large fire. In 1648, the town was ransacked and destroyed by Cossacks and Tatars in the Khmelnytsky Uprising, it also suffered during the Swedish invasion of Poland (1655–1660), when, among other buildings, a local parish church was destroyed. By that time, Goraj already had a Jewish community, with a stone synagogue, built probably in the late 17th century, and destroyed by the Germans in World War II.

Following the Partitions of Poland, Goraj, which for centuries belonged to Lesser Poland's Lublin Voivodeship, was annexed by the Habsburg Empire (1795), and in 1815 it became part of Russian-controlled Congress Poland. In the 19th century, almost all buildings were made of wood, except for the parish church and the synagogue. In 1855, the population was decimated by a cholera epidemic. During the January Uprising, Polish residents of the town supported the rebels, for which in 1869 Russian authorities stripped it of the town charter, and Goraj has remained a village ever since.

Goraj was almost completely destroyed in World War I, and in the Second Polish Republic, it belonged to Lublin Voivodeship, as a poor village without prospects and industry. World War II brought further destruction, as Goraj was burned by the Germans twice – during the Zamość Uprising (September 26, 1942), and in July 1944, during the Operation Tempest. As a result, there are few historic building in the village, with the exception of the parish church (1779–1782), its bell tower (1782), and two 18th century wooden houses.

Notable residents
Rabbi Menachem Mendel Morgensztern, famed as the Kotsker Rebbe, was born in Goraj.

References

Cities and towns in Lublin Voivodeship
Biłgoraj County
Lesser Poland
Lublin Governorate
Lublin Voivodeship (1919–1939)